Al Young (born August 24, 1949) is a former gridiron football wide receiver who played in the National Football League (NFL) and the World Football League (WFL). He played college football at South Carolina State.

College career
Young was a member of the South Carolina State Bulldogs for four seasons. As a senior he had 19 catches for 273 yards and seven touchdowns. Young was inducted into South Carolina State's Athletic Hall of Fame in 2012.

Professional career
Young was selected in the 13th round of the 1971 NFL Draft by the Pittsburgh Steelers. He was inactive for most of his rookie year and only played in the final game of the season. In 1972, Young caught six passes for 86 yards and played in all 14 regular season games. Young was Pittsburgh's leading receiver with four catches for 54 yards and one touchdown in the 1972 AFC Championship Game. 

Young was signed by the New York Stars of the newly-formed World Football League (WFL) in 1974. In his first season with the team, which relocated midway through the season and was renamed the Charlotte Hornets, he caught 33 passes for 399 yards and one touchdown. Young missed part of the 1975 season due to injury and had 13 receptions for 198 yards before the WFL folded.

Post-football
After his football career, Young taught physical education at North Augusta High School and coached the men's basketball and track and field teams for 37 years until retiring in 2014. He returned to coach the North Augusta Girl's Basketball Team, which he has built a dynasty, winning the STATE CHAMPIONSHIP 5 TIMES IN THE PAST 7 YEARS! His team has competed in the State Championship Game 6 of the past 7 years.

References

1949 births
Living people
American football wide receivers
South Carolina State Bulldogs football players
Players of American football from South Carolina
Pittsburgh Steelers players
New York Stars players
Charlotte Hornets (WFL) players